South Fork San Miguel River is a  tributary of the San Miguel River in San Miguel County, Colorado. The river flows north from a confluence of the Lake Fork and the Howard Fork to a confluence with the San Miguel River west of Telluride.

See also
List of rivers of Colorado
List of tributaries of the Colorado River

References

Rivers of Colorado
Rivers of San Miguel County, Colorado
Tributaries of the Colorado River in Colorado